Pre-charged may refer to:

 Pre-charge of the powerline voltages in a high voltage DC application;
 Pre-charged batteries, a type of rechargeable battery